Wade Morton (born Ward Day March 19, 1889 Franklinville, New York – March 1935 Lakeland, Florida) was an American racecar driver.

Morton competed in 17 American Championship Car races from 1922 to 1927 including 7 Indianapolis 500 races (three starts of his own and four drives in relief of others). His best Champ Car finishes were a pair of seventh places on the Beverly Hills and Fresno board ovals in 1923.

He was also a test driver for Auburn and an executive for Meteor Motors. He was credited with designing Auburn's Cabin Speedster but it is likely that Albert Leamy did the primary design work. He died in a road vehicle accident.

Indy 500 results

References

1889 births
1935 deaths
Indianapolis 500 drivers
People from Franklinville, New York
Racing drivers from New York (state)
Road incident deaths in Florida